Bertha von Putelendorf (died 1190) was the daughter of Count Palatine Friedrich von Putelendorf in Saxony.

She married Berthold I, Count of Henneberg (died 1157), and had two surviving children:
Irmingard of Henneberg (a daughter, died 15 July 1197)
Poppo VI, Count of Henneberg (a son, died 14 September 1190)
Bertha was also the grandmother of Agnes of Hohenstaufen through her daughter Irmgard von Henneberg.

References

German countesses
12th-century German women

1190 deaths

Year of birth unknown